U.S. Route 70 or U.S. Highway 70 (US 70) is an east–west United States highway that runs for  from eastern North Carolina to east-central Arizona. It is a major east–west highway of the Southeastern, Southern and Southwestern United States. Established as one of the original highways of 1926, it originally ran only to Holbrook, Arizona, then was extended in 1934 as a coast to coast route, with the current Eastern terminus near the Atlantic Ocean in Atlantic, North Carolina, and the former Western terminus near the Pacific Ocean in Los Angeles, California. The current Western terminus was then truncated to US 60 / SR 77 in Globe, Arizona. Before the completion of the Interstate system, U.S. Highway 70 was sometimes referred to as the "Broadway of America", due to its status as one of the main east–west thoroughfares in the nation. It was also promoted as the "Treasure Trail" by the U.S. Highway 70 Association as of 1951.

In the early years, US 70 had a different route between Clovis, New Mexico and eastern Arizona, taking the route of current US 60 and US 180 to an endpoint in Holbrook. US 70 was later re-routed to El Paso, Texas, when US 60 was extended to California. US 70 was later re-routed again west of Alamogordo, New Mexico along its current route to Globe, as well as being concurrent with US 60 to a common terminus in Los Angeles, California.

Route description

|-
|AZ
|122
|196
|-
|NM
|448
|721
|-
|TX
|255
|410
|-
|OK
|290
|467
|-
|AR
|291
|468
|-
|TN
|480
|773
|-
|NC
|495
|797
|-
|Total
|2,381
|3,382
|}

Arizona

U.S. 70 begins in Globe at a junction with U.S. Route 60, concurrent with State Route 77. SR 77 splits off east of town. U.S. 70 then enters the San Carlos Apache Indian Reservation and runs southeast for 17 miles (27 km) to Peridot, where it crosses Indian Route 9. It has no other highway junctions until Safford, where it begins a ten-mile (16 km) overlap with U.S. 191. U.S. 70 then runs an additional . (59 km) before crossing into New Mexico east of Franklin.

New Mexico

After entering the state of New Mexico, U.S. 70 heads southeast. Five miles (8 km) after crossing the state line, it serves as the southern terminus for New Mexico State Road 92. U.S. 70 does not have another highway junction for 21 mi (34 km), where it meets State Roads 464 and 90 three miles (5 km) north of Lordsburg. At Lordsburg, U.S. 70 joins with Interstate 10 eastbound, splitting off in Las Cruces, and becoming Picacho Avenue in Las Cruces.  When Picacho Avenue meets Main Street, US 70 follows Main Street northbound. U.S. 70 then crosses Interstate 25, and has been upgraded at this point to a controlled access highway until entering the foothills of the Organ Mountains.

As a divided highway, U.S. 70 then crosses the Organ Mountains via San Augustin Pass, descends to the valley floor of the Tularosa Basin, and next crosses the White Sands Missile Range. Overhead missile tests can close the highway for a few hours; this generally happens once or twice a week, and typically only for an hour at a time. The road then passes the entrance to White Sands National Park, and shortly after that passes the southern end of Holloman Air Force Base.  It then turns northbound, and picks up a concurrency with U.S. 54 upon entering Alamogordo.  On the north end of Alamogordo, US54/US70 intersects the beginning of U.S. Route 82 near La Luz.  The concurrency with US 54 lasts until Tularosa, and the highway remains divided until US 70 and US 54 diverge. After splitting off to the northeast, U.S. 70 begins an ascent into the Sacramento Mountains and enters the Lincoln National Forest.  The road then runs across the Mescalero Apache Indian Reservation and near the resort town of Ruidoso. In Hondo, it begins another concurrency, this time with U.S. 380. U.S. 70 then bypasses Roswell to the northwest, together with U.S. 285. U.S. 70 then heads off to the northeast, running through Portales and Clovis before entering Texas at Texico.
From mile 170.6 to mile 197.25 on US 70 the speed limit is posted at 75 mph (120 km/h) across White Sands Missile Range. (26.6-mile stretch) just slightly longer than a standard marathon. US 70 is one of only two non-interstate roadways in New Mexico to receive a speed limit of 75 miles per hour (U.S. 285 between Roswell and Vaughn is also posted at 75 miles per hour).

Texas

U.S. 70 enters Texas joins with U.S. 60 and U.S. 84. U.S. 60 splits off to the northeast in Farwell, just over the state line. U.S. 70/84 then angle southeast to Muleshoe, where the two routes split. U.S. 70 heads due east, meeting U.S. 385 at Springlake, and having an interchange with Interstate 27 in Plainview. U.S. 70 then arcs toward the south to begin a concurrency with US 62 in Floydada. The two routes head east to Paducah, where US 62 splits off to the north to join with U.S. 83. U.S. 70 then proceeds to Vernon, where it overlaps U.S. 287 and U.S. 183 (and has a junction with U.S. 283). Near Oklaunion, U.S. 70/183 split off to the north to cross the Red River into Oklahoma. The route through Texas was cosigned with Texas State Highway 28 before 1939. SH 28 was designated in 1919 as a route from Muleshoe to Olney with a spur, SH 28A, from SH 28 at Crowell east to the Oklahoma border. In 1922, the route split in Benjamin, going south to Sagerton and east to Olney. In 1926, The portion from Crowell to Sagerton became SH 51, while the portion from Benjamin to Olney became SH 24. SH 28 was instead rerouted over SH 28A to end at the Oklahoma border. By 1939, the route was cancelled due to US 70.

Oklahoma

U.S. 70 then passes south of Waurika. U.S. 70 then becomes a four-lane divided highway near Wilson and runs through Lone Grove before entering the city of Ardmore, where it briefly heads south on Interstate 35, bypassing the central business district. US-70 serves as the southern terminus of U.S. 177 in Madill. U.S. 70 then heads to Durant, where it has an interchange with the U.S. 69/75 freeway.

East of Soper, U.S.70 joins with U.S.271. The two routes then approach Hugo, where they serve as the southern terminus of the Indian Nation Turnpike. U.S. 271 also splits off at this interchange, continuing the freeway southbound from the turnpike. U.S. 70 then heads through downtown Hugo. It then bypasses Idabel to the north (with Bypass U.S. 70 providing a western and southern bypass). It then meets U.S. 259 and State Highway 3 northeast of town and overlaps them into Broken Bow, forming a wrong-way concurrency with SH-3. U.S. 70 then splits off to the east in Broken Bow before leaving the state.

Arkansas

It then heads northeast to Dierks, where it begins a concurrency with U.S. 278. U.S. 70 then heads east-northeast to Hot Springs, which it bypasses to the south on a freeway alignment shared with U.S. 270. U.S. 70 then heads east to join with Interstate 30 at Exit 111 south of Benton. The two highways run concurrently to the state capital, Little Rock, where U.S. 70 splits off from I-30 at Interstate 430 at Exit 129. U.S. 70 follows Interstate Highway 430 for 1 mile to Exit 1 (Stagecoach Road), where it overlaps Arkansas Highway 5 heading northeast into Little Rock, becoming Colonel Glenn Rd at the intersection with Arkansas Highway 300. Continuing northeast through Little Rock, U.S. 70 turns east again at Roosevelt Road, before turning north through downtown Little Rock as Broadway Street, with during which it crosses Interstate 630 before crossing the Arkansas River into North Little Rock. It then crosses Interstate Highway 30, and serves as the northern terminus of U.S. Route 165. U.S. 70 then crosses Interstate 440 and leaves the Little Rock area, paralleled by I-40.

U.S. 70 continues its alignment near I-40 throughout eastern Arkansas, generally about two or three miles (5 km) apart. I-40 bypasses Forrest City to the north, while U.S. 70 serves the city center. The two routes remain close through West Memphis, Arkansas, where U.S. 70 runs along Broadway Blvd. Finally, U.S. 70 joins with I-55 to cross the Mississippi River into Tennessee.

Tennessee

US 70 enters Tennessee, as well as the city of Memphis, concurrent with Interstate 55, US 61, US 64, and US 79. At exit 12, the northernmost exit on I-55 in the state, I-55 turns south; however, the four US routes continue east onto the at-grade Crump Boulevard. US 61 splits from the concurrency soon afterward, heading south along 3rd Street to exit the city for Walls, Mississippi and points south. US 64, 70 and 79, however, remain overlapped through downtown Memphis, following Danny Thomas Boulevard north to Union Avenue, Union east to East Parkway (briefly overlapping with U.S. Route 51 along the western portion of Union), then East Parkway north to Summer Avenue, where the triple concurrency turns east. Near the city line, US 64/70/79 interchanges with Interstate 40 at exit 12A.

Past the Memphis city limits in the suburb of Bartlett, U.S. 64 separates from U.S. 70/79, taking a more southerly routing through the state. U.S. 70 and US 79, meanwhile, head to the northeast, paralleling I-40 to Brownsville. East of the city, U.S. 79 breaks from U.S. 70, following U.S. 70 Alternate out of the city to the northeast. U.S. 70, now concurrent with only its unsigned designation of State Route 1, heads east, interchanging with I-40 at exit 66 before entering Jackson. The route continues northeastward from the city, meeting I-40 once more at exit 87 just outside the city limits. At Huntingdon, U.S. 70 Alternate rejoins US 70 as the main route turns to the east toward New Johnsonville, where it crosses the Tennessee River.

From the river, U.S. 70 continues eastward through Waverly and Dickson to the Nashville area. Southwest of the city near Pegram, U.S. Route 70S splits off from U.S. 70; however, U.S. 70 now continues to be signed as U.S. 70 instead of U.S. 70N, as it was formerly. U.S. 70 follows I-40 into Nashville, meeting the concurrent I-40/I-65 immediately west of the city center. The route turns south, acting as collector/distributor roads for I-40/I-65 for two blocks before joining U.S. 431 and U.S. 70S on a brief overlap. At an intersection with the concurrent U.S. 31/U.S. 41, U.S. 431 and U.S. 70S split from U.S. 70. U.S. 70 progresses eastward, roughly paralleling the Cumberland River to an interchange with State Route 155 east of downtown. U.S. 70, now paired with State Route 24, heads east out of Nashville to Lebanon, where U.S. Route 70N breaks from the main US 70. US 70 heads southeast, passing through Smithville before rejoining U.S. 70S in Sparta and U.S. 70N to the east in Crossville.

From Crossville eastward to the North Carolina state line, U.S. 70 closely parallels I-40, passing through the Roane County cities of Rockwood and Kingston. At Dixie Lee Junction in eastern Loudon County U.S. 70 intersects U.S. 11 (also known as the Lee Highway) in Dixie Lee Junction and the two highways are concurrent from the junction intersection eastward through Farragut and into Knoxville. In Farragut and west of downtown Knoxville U.S. 70 carries the name Kingston Pike. On the east side of Knoxville it becomes concurrent with U.S. 25W and U.S. 11E and carries the name Asheville Highway from Knoxville to the community of Trentville in eastern Knox County. At Trentville, US 11E separates from the concurrency. U.S. 25W remains overlapped with U.S. 70 to Newport, where U.S. 70 is joined by U.S. 25E, which becomes US 25. U.S. 25 and U.S. 70 remain concurrent into North Carolina.

North Carolina

US 70 enters North Carolina as a two-lane road in concurrency with US 25.  Going southeast, it widens to four-lane near Marshall, merging farther down with I-26/US 19/US 23 going into Asheville.  In the downtown area, it breaks from the U.S. 19/23 freeway onto city streets and through Beaucatcher Tunnel as it goes east; paralleling north of I-40, going through the cities Marion, Morganton, Hickory, Conover and Statesville.  From there, it goes southeast to Salisbury, where it starts to parallel I-85 north through Lexington, Thomasville, High Point and Greensboro, in concurrency with I-85 Bus/US 29.

US 70 passes through Greensboro in concurrency with Interstate 40, Interstate 85 Business, then US Routes 29 and 220 briefly, then heads east through the Wendover Avenue expressway, which takes the route out of town towards Burlington. It downgrades to a two lane rural road heading out of Greensboro, and again parallels north of I-40/I-85. Entering Alamance County, it expands to a four-lane expressway through the city of Burlington, then returns to 2 lanes through Mebane, Efland and Hillsborough.  It joins I-85 briefly in Eno, then veers southeast through the downtown areas of both Durham and Raleigh.

After a brief overlap with I-40 near Garner, it continues in a southeasterly direction, as it goes through or bypasses the cities of Clayton, Smithfield, Selma, Goldsboro and Kinston.  Near and through New Bern, US 70 briefly becomes a freeway but returns to expressway grade as it goes through Havelock.  After passing through Morehead City and Beaufort, it drops back to a two-lane rural road as it travels close along the Core Sound.  After passing the southern terminus of NC 12 (which connects to the Outer Banks), near Sealevel, US 70 ends its seven state tour in the community of Atlantic.

History

Most or all of the present route designated as U.S. Route 70 (or U.S. Highway 70 depending on the state) was earlier known as Lee Highway.  During the earliest days of the automobile, and earlier, American highways were disorganized affairs of widely varying quality.  Highways were known by a bewildering variety of names which typically changed at each town.  And they were only named, not numbered.

During the 1910s the first national highway was conceived:  the Lincoln Highway, named in honor of Abraham Lincoln, stretching across the northern United States from coast to coast.  A companion effort was launched to create a transcontinental highway stretching across the southern half of the country, this one named in honor of Confederate States of America general Robert E. Lee.  The two highways were a revolution of sorts, in that a driver could follow a single road from coast to coast bearing the same designation.  Much of today's U.S. 70 was formerly the Lee Highway, although that was later removed.

When originally commissioned on 11 November 1926, U.S. Route 70 ran between Beaufort, North Carolina and U.S. Route 66 in Holbrook, Arizona. This older route ran from present day US 70 in Clovis, New Mexico through Vaughn, Willard (where former child route U.S. Route 470 branched off to Albuquerque) and Springerville, Arizona before finally reaching US 66 in Holbrook. In 1932, US 70 was rerouted to El Paso, Texas from Clovis along what is today U.S. Route 54. The re-routing temporarily removed US 70 entirely from Arizona. The old route to Holbrook was replaced by U.S. Route 60 and U.S. Route 260. That same year, the eastern terminus of US 70 was extended to Atlantic, North Carolina, where it remains to this day (albeit in a slightly different location). In 1934, the routing was changed yet again and US 70 was rerouted to California through Las Cruces, New Mexico, Deming, Globe, Arizona and Phoenix to a junction with U.S. Route 99 around Mecca. Between Globe and its new western end in California, US 70 was paired with US 60. A year later, US 70 was extended along Valley Boulevard and reached downtown Los Angeles at U.S. Route 101 running concurrent with US 99 and/or US 60 throughout its course west of Globe. Beginning in 1964 it was decommissioned in favor of Interstate 10 or US 60. After being removed from California, US 70 ended at the California/Arizona state line in Ehrenberg until 1969, when it was further truncated to its current endpoint in Globe. US 70, unlike many other decommissioned US Highways in California, doesn't have a state route that was numbered after it and taking over its path (unlike US 60, which had State Route 60 to replace it), since the current State Route 70 bears no relation to this highway.

Robert Mitchum and Don Raye's song, "The Ballad of Thunder Road" immortalized in the 1958 film of the same name, follows a family of anarchistic moonshiners who engage in run-ins with the police.  The Mitchum film is based on a real life incident in which a moonshiner perishes on the road on the Kingston Pike stretch of Highway 70 in Knoxville while on the run from the police, although the actual filming did not take place on Highway 70.

Historic alignments
Old and bypassed sections of US 70 exist, and at least one such road section has been listed on the National Register of Historic Places. It is located in Lonoke County, Arkansas, between Young Road and point east of the present US 70's junction with Arkansas Highway 15. It was built about 1913, and some of its original bituminous pavement survives. It was replaced by the present alignment in 1930–31. Between Florence, Arizona and Wickenburg, Arizona, US 70 ran concurrently with both US 60 and US 89.

Future
Currently, a portion of US 70 in Greensboro runs concurrently with US 29/ US 220, I-40, and soon-to-be-removed I-85 Business.  On 5 October 2019, NCDOT submitted an application to AASHTO, and was granted approval, for the relocation of US 70 in Greensboro, High Point, and Thomasville. The state plan calls for the US Highway to remain on Wendover Avenue and NC Highway 68 in the cities of Greensboro and High Point, respectively, towards Thomasville. According to NCDOT, this will give the US Highway a more direct, continuous route through the cities of Greensboro and High Point, and improve safety and regional connectivity.

Major intersections
Arizona
  in Globe
  in Safford. The highways travel concurrently to southeast of San Jose.
New Mexico
  in Lordsburg. The highways travel concurrently to Las Cruces.
  in Deming. The highways travel concurrently to Las Cruces.
  in Las Cruces
  in Alamogordo. The highways travel concurrently to Tularosa.
  in Alamogordo
  in Hondo. The highways travel concurrently to Roswell.
  in Roswell. US 70/US 285 travels concurrently to north of Roswell.
  in Clovis. US 60/US 70 travels concurrently to Texico. US 70/US 84 travels concurrently to Muleshoe, Texas.
Texas
  in Springlake
  in Plainview
  in Floydada. The highways travel concurrently to Paducah.
  in Paducah
  in Vernon. The highways travel concurrently to Oklaunion.
  in Vernon. US 70/US 183 travels concurrently to Davidson, Oklahoma.
Oklahoma
  west-southwest of Randlett. US 70/US 277/US 281 travels concurrently to Randlett.
  in Waurika
  in Ardmore. The highways travel concurrently through Ardmore.
  in Ardmore
  in Madill. The highways travel concurrently through Madill.
  in Durant
  east-northeast of Soper. The highways travel concurrently to south of Hugo.
  in Idabel. The highways travel concurrently to Broken Bow.
Arkansas
  in De Queen. The highways travel concurrently to north-northwest of Lockesburg.
  in Dierks. The highways travel concurrently to north-northeast of Dierks.
  in Hot Springs. The highways travel concurrently through Hot Springs.
  northwest of Haskell. The highways travel concurrently to Little Rock.
  southwest of Benton. The highways travel concurrently to Little Rock.
  in Little Rock
  in Little Rock
  in Little Rock
  in North Little Rock
  in North Little Rock
  in Hazen. The highways travel concurrently through Hazen.
  in Brinkley. The highways travel concurrently through Brinkley.
  south of Jennette
  in West Memphis. I-55/US 61/US 70 travels concurrently to Memphis, Tennessee. US 64/US 70 travels concurrently to the Memphis–Bartlett, Tennessee city line. US 70/US 79 travels concurrently to Brownsville, Tennessee.
Tennessee
  in Memphis
  in Memphis. The highways travel concurrently through Memphis.
  in Memphis
  in Memphis
  in Memphis
  in Arlington
  east of Brownsville
  in Jackson
  northeast of Jackson.
  northeast of Jackson
  south of Camden
  in Nashville
  in Nashville
  in Nashville. The highways travel concurrently, but on different lanes, through Nashville.
  in Nashville. The highways travel concurrently through Nashville.
  in Lebanon
  in Lebanon
  in Lebanon
  in Crossville
  in Crossville
  south-southwest of Rockwood. The highways travel concurrently to Rockwood.
  in Lenoir City
  southwest of Farragut. The highways travel concurrently to Knoxville.
  in Knoxville.
  in Knoxville
  in Knoxville
  in Knoxville. The highways travel concurrently through Knoxville.
  in Knoxville
  in Knoxville. US 11E/US 70 travels concurrently to south-southeast of Mascot.
  in Knoxville. US 25W/US 70 travels concurrently to Newport.
  west of Dandridge
  in Newport. The highways travel concurrently through Newport
  in Newport
  in Newport. US 25/US 70 travels concurrently to Woodfin, North Carolina.
  in Newport. The highways travel concurrently through Newport.
North Carolina
 . The highways travel concurrently to Asheville.
  in Asheville
  in Asheville. I-240/US 70 travels concurrently through Asheville.
  in Asheville
  in Black Mountain. The highways travel concurrently to southwest of Old Fort.
  in Marion
  in Morganton. The highways travel concurrently through Morganton.
  in Hickory
  in Statesville
  in Statesville
  in Statesville
  in Salisbury. The highways travel concurrently through Salisbury.
  in Salisbury. US 29/US 70 travels concurrently to Greensboro.
  northeast of Spencer. I-85/US 70 travels concurrently to southwest of Lexington. US 52/US 70 travels concurrently to west of Lexington.
  southwest of Lexington. I-285/US 70 travel concurrently to west of Lexington.
  in Lexington. The highways travel concurrently through Lexington.
  in High Point
  southwest of Greensboro. The highways travel concurrently through Greensboro.
  in Greensboro
  in Greensboro
  in Greensboro. The highways travel concurrently through Greensboro.
  in Greensboro
  in Eno. The highways travel concurrently to Durham.
  in Durham. The highways travel concurrently through Durham.
  in Raleigh
  in Raleigh
  in Raleigh. The highways travel concurrently through Raleigh.
  in Raleigh
  in Garner. The highways travel concurrently to west-southwest of Clayton.
  in Selma
  in Selma
  in Goldsboro
  in Goldsboro. The highways travel concurrently through Goldsboro.
  in Kinston. The highways travel concurrently through Kinston.
  west of New Bern. The highways travel concurrently to the New Bern–James City city line.
 Seashore Drive/School Drive in Atlantic

Special routes

Branch routes
In Tennessee, US-70 has two additional branches: US-70N and US-70S.  This split is unique, in that it is the only existing instance of a N/S split of a U.S. Route.  Furthermore, US-70 does not "disappear" at these splits; thus, these two highways co-exist with the main route and both serve as additional branches.  US-70N begins in Lebanon, just east of Nashville, and ends in Crossville; US-70S begins in the Bellevue neighborhood of southwest Nashville, and ends in Sparta (a few miles west of Crossville).  Historically, both split routes began in Pegram and ended in Crossville. The original designation for US-70 between Lebanon and Sparta was state route 26.

Alternate routes
There are currently two active alternate routes, all signed and marked on maps as US 70A.

 Brownville-Huntingdon, Tennessee
 Pine Level, North Carolina

Business routes
 Pomona, California Decommissioned
 Alamogordo, New Mexico
 Ruidoso, New Mexico
 Portales, New Mexico
 Hugo, Oklahoma
 De Queen, Arkansas
 Glenwood, Arkansas
 Hot Springs, Arkansas
 Little Rock, Arkansas
 Huntingdon, Tennessee
 Camden, Tennessee
 Dickson, Tennessee
 Lebanon, Tennessee
 Marshall, North Carolina
 Morganton, North Carolina
 Lexington, North Carolina
 Hillsborough, North Carolina
 Durham, North Carolina
 Clayton, North Carolina
 Smithfield, North Carolina
 Goldsboro, North Carolina
 Kinston, North Carolina
 Newport, North Carolina
 New Bern, North Carolina

Bypass routes
 Durant, Oklahoma Bypass construction begin 2008
 Idabel, Oklahoma
 Selma, North Carolina
 Clayton, North Carolina
 Goldsboro, North Carolina

See also

 Interstate 40
 National Register of Historic Places listings in Lonoke County, Arkansas

Related routes
 U.S. Route 170
 U.S. Route 270
 U.S. Route 370
 U.S. Route 470

References

External links

 Endpoints of U.S. Highway 70
NC DOT State Travel Map

 
70
70
070
Roads on the National Register of Historic Places in Arkansas
National Register of Historic Places in Lonoke County, Arkansas